The Pilatus PC-7 Turbo Trainer is a low-wing tandem-seat training aircraft designed and manufactured by Pilatus Aircraft of Switzerland. The aircraft is capable of all basic training functions including aerobatics, instrument, tactical and night flying.

The PC-7 was developed from the preceding Pilatus P-3, largely differing by the adoption of a turboprop engine, a bubble canopy, and a new one-piece wing. Introduced during the 1970s, it has since developed a sizable presence of the global trainer market. The type has been adopted by in excess of 20 air forces as their ab initio trainer, as well as multiple civilian operators. Over one million hours have reportedly been flown by PC-7s worldwide. In addition to training operations, some aircraft are armed and have been used for combat missions by several customers, including Chad, Iran, and Mexico, often in violation of the relevant export agreement between the customer and the Swiss government.

An improved model of the aircraft, the PC-7 Mk II, was developed during the 1990s by combining the newer PC-9's airframe and avionics with the PC-7's smaller turbine engine. Reportedly, in excess of 500 PC-7s have been sold to various operators, the majority of which still being in service. In Pilatus' line-up, the PC-7 has been succeeded by the newer PC-9 and PC-21 trainers.

Development

Origins
Work on what would become the PC-7 commenced during the 1960s. It was based on the earlier piston-powered Pilatus P-3, the initial prototype being produced from the existing prototype P-3, principally differing by the substitution of its Lycoming O-435 engine with a Pratt & Whitney PT6A-20 turboprop powerplant. On 12 April 1966, the modified prototype performed its maiden flight. However, the PC-7 programme was abruptly shelved following an accident involving the aircraft. The termination of work was reportedly driven by a lack of market interest.

During 1973, it was decided to restart work on the programme; factors for its revival had included the 1973 oil crisis, the launch of the rival Beechcraft T-34C Turbo-Mentor, and the increasing age of existing trainer aircraft. To support the relaunch, another P-3 was obtained from the Swiss Air Force. After modifications, this aircraft first flew on 12 May 1975. Further extensive modifications followed later in the programme, including the adoption of a new one-piece wing complete with integral fuel tanks, along with an altered tailfin and a bubble canopy. The flight test programme came to a close during Autumn 1977.

On 12 August 1978, the first production aircraft made its first flight. On 5 December of that year, Switzerland's Federal Office of Civil Aviation (FOCA) issued civil certification for the PC-7; immediately thereafter, initial deliveries of production aircraft commenced to customers Burma and Bolivia. Over time, sales of the PC-7 generated considerable profits, allowing the company to finance the development of further types of aircraft.

Further development
The PC-7 Mk II is a development of the PC-9's airframe and avionics, which was powered by the PC-7's smaller turbine engine, which reportedly achieved lower operating and maintenance costs. This variant was developed at the behest of the South African Air Force (SAAF), who later adopted the type. A batch of 60 PC-7 MK IIs were locally assembled in South Africa using kits supplied by Pilatus for the SAAF; due to political considerations, these aircraft were not fitted with the armament hardpoints. Deliveries to the SAAF took place between late 1994 and 1996.

In addition to Pilatus' own improvement programmes, several third-party companies have independently developed their own upgrades for customer's PC-7. During the late 1990s, Israel I engineering firm Radom began offering a kit of new avionics for the type, which included a new mission computer, a wide-angle head-up display, along with various replacement communications and weapons-delivery systems.

During July 1998, Pilatus announced that it has come to an agreement with American company Western Aircraft for the latter to act as a distributor for the PC-7 across the North American civil aviation market. At this time, there were already five civil-registered PC-7s in operation in North America; Pilatus believed that the region could be a viable market for both remanufactured and newly built examples of the type, which would be priced between $1 million and $2 million respectively. It was recognised that this market was limited, Western Aircraft expected to sell only a few aircraft per year.

Operational history

General use
All export sales of the PC-7 are subject to approval by the Swiss Government, whose authorisation is required prior to any delivery taking place. The sale of combat-capable aircraft has been a controversial matter at times, and political pressure has been applied for PC-7s to be shipped without the fittings for armaments being installed. The Swiss government has occasionally held up or outright refused to issue export licences for some nations, a move which has reportedly lead to the loss of several potential sales, such as to South Korea and Mexico.

In addition to its adoption by numerous military customers, the PC-7 has also been used by private customers. It has been certified for civil use by both the FOCA and the Federal Aviation Administration (FAA) as compliant with regulations pertaining to general aviation operations in both Europe and the United States. Amongst its uses in the civilian sector has been aerobatic displays.

During the 1990s, the PC-7 Mk II was adopted as the basic trainer of the Royal Brunei Air Force alongside the BAE Systems Hawk jet trainer; the acquisition was seen a key to its expanded operations with fixed-wing aircraft.

During June 2011, the Indian Air Force (IAF) selected the PC-7 MkII as its new basic trainer, signing a contract for an initial batch of 75 aircraft with an option for buying an additional 38 PC-7 MkIIs; the service had a total requirement of 181 trainers. The fast-tracked decision to procure a foreign aircraft over a domestically developed alternative proposed by Hindustan Aeronautics Limited (HAL) was a controversial one; retired Air Marshal Anil Chopra argued that HAL had no viable design for the role and that the IAF could not have reasonably afforded the delay involved in the development of such an aircraft. The procurement of an additional 106 trainers under the ‘Make & Buy (Indian) category was repeatedly deferred. In 2017, the maintenance agreement with Pilatus lapsed, resulting in the IAF becoming solely responsible for performing these activities. During 2018, India announced that it had chosen to exercise the option of buying a batch of 38 trainers.

Combat use
A number of PC-7s were employed by the Guatemalan Air Force in air strikes and for close air support (CAS) during the Guatemalan civil war, starting in 1982 until the end of the conflict in 1996. The PC-7s were typically deployed from the airfield in La Aurora, being armed with a mixture of gun pods and rocket pods.

During the lengthy Iran–Iraq War of the 1980s, amid tensions between Iran and the United States, it is alleged that Iranian officials threatened to arm its PC-7 fleet with explosives and use them to launch suicide attacks against United States Navy vessels present in the Persian Gulf. Iran reportedly trained a number of suicide pilots and flew some operational missions, training was performed at Bushehr Air Base in Iran and overseas in North Korea. In early 1984, an Iranian attack helicopter AH-1J Sea Cobra was shot down by an Iraqi PC-7 during Operation Khyber (Iranian pilots Reza Moghadam and Mohammad Yazdi were rescued).

In 1994, the Mexican Air Force used several armed PC-7s to attack units of the Zapatista Army of National Liberation during the Chiapas conflict in Mexico. This action was considered illegal by the Swiss government because the airplanes were sold for training purposes only, and as result, Switzerland issued a ban on the sale of additional units to Mexico. At the time, the Mexican Air Force was the largest single export operator of the type and had been seeking to acquire further PC-7s, thus the sales ban was viewed as an economic blow to Pilatus.

During the mid to late 1990s, Executive Outcomes, a private military contractor (PMC) led by Eeben Barlow, utilised three armed PC-7s (ex-Bophuthatswana Air Force aircraft) to provide close air support (CAS) during its operations in Sierra Leone.

During the late 2000s, the Chadian Air Force reportedly used its small fleet of PC-7s to bomb rebel positions both in their own territory and in neighbouring Sudan. The Swiss government summoned the Chad's ambassador to request an explanation for these reports, as these actions breached the export agreements previously struck for the sale of the type to Chad.

Variants
 PC-7 : two-seat basic trainer aircraft, powered by PT6A-25A engine rated at 410 kW (550 shp).
 PC-7 Mk II is a development of the PC-9's airframe and avionics, retaining the PC-7's wing to mount external stores. Powered by PT6A-25C of 522 kW (700 shp) rather than more powerful PT6A-62 of PC-9. Developed for the SAAF, and known as the "Astra"; the aircraft is a hybrid PC-7 and PC-9, either a PC-7 "Heavy" or a PC-9 "Lite" depending on point of configuration.
 NCPC-7 : upgraded version of the standard PC-7 with fully IFR glass cockpit avionics, developed for the Swiss Air Force. The designation NCPC-7 has been provisionally used in the Swiss Air Force to differentiate modernized PC-7s (NC for New Cockpit) from those which were not yet done. It was removed after the improvement of the last of the 28 aircraft in 2009. Consequently, all the Turbo-Trainer took again the designation PC-7.

Operators

Military operators

An incomplete list of the users of the PC-7:

 National Air Force of Angola: 12 ordered in 1981, with deliveries starting in 1982

 Austrian Air Force: 13 aircraft remaining in service as of December 2021

 Bolivian Air Force: 24 aircraft delivered. 2 remain in service as of December 2021

 Botswana Defence Force Air Wing: seven (delivered from 1990) to be replaced by five PC-7 Mk 2s in 2013. Five PC-7 Mk II aircraft formally accepted into service on February 8, 2013, removing six PC-7s from service.

 Royal Brunei Air Force: has four (PC-7 Mk 2). The type is also used by the Alap-Alap Formation aerobatic display team.

 Chad Air Force: two aircraft remaining in service as of December 2021

 Chilean Navy: seven aircraft remain in service as of December 2021

 Direction générale de l'armement: 6 aircraft delivered

 Guatemalan Air Force: one aircraft remaining in service as of December 2021
 
 Indian Air Force: 78 India has decided to shelve ordering 38 more    and placed orders for HAL HTT-40

 Islamic Republic of Iran Air Force: 34 aircraft remain in service as of December 2021

 Royal Malaysian Air Force: 30 PC-7 Turbo Trainers out of a first order of 44 (delivered from 1983), 17 PC-7 Mk IIs out of a second order of 19 (delivered in two batches, nine from 2001 and ten from 2007). Total of 47 currently in service. The type is also used by the Taming Sari aerobatic display team.

 Mexican Air Force: 88 (first delivery May 1979)

 Myanmar Air Force: first deliveries in 1979. 16 aircraft in service as of December 2021

 Royal Netherlands Air Force: 13 aircraft in service as of December 2021

 South African Air Force: 60 (PC-7 Mk 2s). The type is also used by the Silver Falcons aerobatic display team.

 Swiss Air Force: 40 (delivered from 1979), 28 PC-7 upgraded with new cockpit in service in 2011. The type is also used by the PC-7 Team aerobatic display team.

 United Arab Emirates Air Force: 31 aircraft in service as of December 2021
 
 Uruguayan Air Force: 5 aircraft in service as of December 2021

Former military operators
  Bophuthatswana
 Bophuthatswana Air Force
 Three (delivered from 1989, later transferred to South Africa and subsequently served in the Sierra Leone civil war and Chad)

 Iraq Air Force: 52 (delivered from 1980)

 Nigerian Air Force had two aircraft in service.

Former civil operators

 Swissair

Accidents and incidents
The South African Air Force (SAAF) grounded their fleet of PC-7 MkIIs after a crash on 15 January 2008. The aircraft went down shortly after takeoff from Overberg Air Force Base in the Western Cape Province. SAAF Lieutenant-Colonel Chris Meiring, 58, died shortly after the crash. The aircraft was flying to Langebaanweg Air Force Base for maintenance but shortly after takeoff it rolled and flew into the ground. The cause is believed to have been a structural problem.

In March 2010, a pilot was killed when his Royal Malaysian Air Force (RMAF) aircraft exploded and caught fire in midair during a solo airshow. This is the fifth accident involving Royal Malaysian Air Force PC-7 aircraft.

In June 2010, two Mexican pilots were killed when their Air Force PC-7 crashed after taking off from Pie de la Cuesta, a district in the resort city of Acapulco, Mexico. The PC-7 crashed into the sea near Acapulco.

On 20 October 2011, two PC-7s of the Botswana Defence Force were involved in a midair collision over Letlhakeng 100 km west of Gaborone. Two of the four aircrew involved were killed in the accident.

On 12 September 2017 a pilot was killed when his Swiss Air Force PC-7 crashed at the Schreckhorn in Canton Bern on its way from Payerne AFB to Locarno AFB.

Specifications (PC-7 Turbo Trainer)

See also

References

Citations

Bibliography
 Bodansky, Yossef. "Target America & the West: Terrorism Today." SP Books, 1993. .
 Cordesman, Anthony H. and Abraham R. Wagner. "The Lessons of Modern War: The Iran-Iraq War." Westview Press, 1991. .
 

 
 Jackson, Paul. "Jane's All The World's Aircraft 2003–2004." Coulsdon, UK: Jane's Information Group, 2003. .
 Lambert, Mark. "Jane's All The World's Aircraft 1993-94." Coulsdon, UK: Jane's Data Division, 1993. .
 Razoux, Pierre. "The Iran-Iraq War." Harvard University Press, 2015. .
 "The Svelte Switzer ... Pilatus' Turbo Trainer". Air International, Vol. 16, No. 3, September 1979, pp. 111–118.

External links

 

PC-07
1960s Swiss military trainer aircraft
Single-engined tractor aircraft
Low-wing aircraft
Single-engined turboprop aircraft
Aircraft first flown in 1966